The Rowe Cup is a race held annually at Alexandra Park, Auckland, New Zealand for standardbred horses.

The Rowe Cup is run over a distance of 3200 m. Along with the Dominion Handicap raced at Addington Raceway it is one of the major harness races for trotters rather than pacers.

Records
Most wins:
 3 - Lyell Creek (2000, 2001, 2004)

Most wins by a driver:
 6 - Tony Herlihy (1991, 1997, 2007, 2009, 2017, 2022)
 5 - Peter Wolfenden (1960, 1968, 1969, 1977, 1980)
 4 - Anthony Butt (2000, 2001, 2003, 2004)
 4 - Maurice McKendry (1986, 1992, 1993, 2008)
 4 - J T Paul (1926, 1927, 1935, 1936)
 4 - R Young (1946, 1949, 1950, 1952)
 3 - M F Holmes (1956, 1959, 1961)
 3 - L J Mahoney (1938, 1939, 1941)
 3 - W Orange (1920, 1922, 1923)

Winners list 

The following are winners of the Rowe Cup:

Other major races
 Dominion Handicap
 Inter Dominion Trotting Championship
 Inter Dominion Pacing Championship
 Auckland Trotting Cup
 New Zealand Trotting Cup
 Great Northern Derby
 Noel J Taylor Mile
 New Zealand Messenger

See also 
 Harness racing in New Zealand

References

Horse races in New Zealand
Harness racing in New Zealand
Rowe Cup winners